Valerius ( 421–455) was a politician of the Eastern Roman Empire, brother of the Empress Aelia Eudocia.

Life 

Valerius was born in Athens, son of the pagan and sophist philosopher Leontius, and brother of Gessius and Athenais. In 421 Athenais changed her name to Aelia Eudocia and married the Emperor Theodosius II; as result, Valerius and Gessius received several honours.

First Valerius was appointed comes rerum privatarum (425), then comes sacrarum largitionum, then consul in 432, to be finally appointed magister officiorum in 435.

In 455 Valerius wrote to his sister, at Jerusalem, trying to persuade her to leave the christological party of Eutyches and to return to the Nicene faith, to which Valerius evidently belonged.

Sources 
 

5th-century Byzantine people
5th-century Roman consuls
Byzantine Athenians
Byzantine officials
Comites rerum privatarum
Comites sacrarum largitionum
Imperial Roman consuls
Magistri officiorum
Theodosian dynasty
Valerii